Sakon may refer to:
 Karakurizōshi Ayatsuri Sakon (Puppet Master Sakon), a 1999 manga and anime series
 Sakon (Naruto), a ninja from the Land of Sound in the manga and anime series Naruto
 Sakon, a character in the early 2000's video game The Legend of Zelda: Majora's
Mask
 The left section of a Nunchaku

People 
 Shima Sakon (1540–1600), samurai living during the Azuchi-Momoyama Period of Feudal Japan
 Sakon Yamamoto (born 1982), Formula One driver

See also 
 Sakon Nakhon (disambiguation)